Alexandra's Project is a 2003 Australian drama thriller film written and directed by Rolf de Heer and starring Gary Sweet and Helen Buday.

Plot
Upon returning home from work on his birthday, Steve (Gary Sweet), a middle class husband and father of two, finds the house dark and his family not home. He notices a chair, his television set, and a video tape obviously set out for his viewing. He turns the TV and VCR on, and begins to watch a tape made for him by his wife, Alexandra (Helen Buday). The first clip shows his wife and children wishing him a happy birthday, but after the kids leave the room, Alexandra begins a striptease, and it appears to be nothing more than a birthday gift. As it progresses, however, it becomes clear that the tape is designed to humiliate and torture Steve for marital problems that Alexandra has been stewing about for years.
As part of her 'show', Alexandra feigns breast cancer, has sex with their neighbor, and tells Steve that neither she nor their two children are ever coming home.

Cast 
 Gary Sweet as Steve
 Helen Buday as Alexandra
 Bogdan Koca as Bill
 Jack Christie as Sam
 Samantha Knigge as Emma
 Eileen Darley as Christine
 Geoff Revell as Rodney
 Philip Spruce as Taxi Driver
 Nathan O'Keefe as Man at Door
 Peter Greena as Chairman
 Martha Lott as Female Worker
 Cindy Elliott as Female Worker
 Gemma Falk as Female Worker
 Nicole Daniel as Female Worker
 Duncan Graham as Male Worker
 Michael Ienna as Male Worker

Production
De Heer originally wanted to make the film so he could use a single location and use up various fragments of ideas he had accumulated.

Release
The film's world premiere was 14 February 2003 as part of the Berlin International Film Festival and was released regularly as Cinema release on 8 May 2003 in Australia.

Reception

Box office
Alexandra's Project took $844,494 at the box office in Australia.

Critical reception
On Rotten Tomatoes the film has rating of 53% based on 19 reviews, with an average 5.56/10 rating. The Cultural Post gave it three out of five stars.

Accolades

Home media
Alexandra's Project was released by Fandango Australia / Palace Films as a DVD in 2003.

See also
 Cinema of Australia
 South Australian Film Corporation

References

External links 
 
 Alexandra's Project at the National Film and Sound Archive
 

2003 films
Australian thriller films
2003 thriller films
Films directed by Rolf de Heer
Films set in abandoned houses
Films set in South Australia
2000s English-language films